Zoosadism is pleasure derived from cruelty to animals. It is part of the Macdonald triad, a set of three behaviors that are considered a precursor to psychopathic behavior.

Research
Some studies have suggested that individuals who are cruel to animals are more likely to be violent to humans. According to The New York Times:

Helen Gavin wrote however in Criminological and Forensic Psychology (2013):

Alan R. Felthous reported in his paper "Aggression Against Cats, Dogs, and People" (1980):

This is a commonly reported finding, and for this reason, cruelty to animals is often considered a warning sign of potential violence towards humans.

Examples 
An adult man in Cuba, by the name of Rubén Marrero Pernas was found to be raping, torturing then killing dogs or puppies and recording the acts online for an audience who found this to be likewise sexually gratifying.

Serial killer Jeffrey Dahmer was known for torturing and killing animals in his youth, such as poisoning tadpoles.

Legal status
In the United States, since 2010, it has been a federal offense to create or distribute "obscene" depictions of "living non-human mammals, birds, reptiles, or amphibians ... subjected to serious bodily injury". This statute replaced an overly broad 1999 statute which was found unconstitutional in United States v. Stevens.

Criticism of alleged link to violence against humans
On the other hand, Piers Beirne, a professor of criminology at the University of Southern Maine, has criticized existing studies for ignoring socially accepted practices of violence against animals, such as animal slaughter and vivisection, that might be linked to violence against humans.

See also
 Bloodsport
 Cruelty to animals

References

External links
 Four-legged Forensics: What Forensic Nurses Need to Know and Do About Animal Cruelty

Abuse
Animal welfare
Cruelty to animals
Paraphilias
Zoophilia